Club Atlético Huracán Corrientes, known as Huracán  Corrientes is a football club from Corrientes, Corrientes Province, Argentina. The team currently plays in the Torneo Argentino C, the fifth division of the Argentine football league system. Huracán has only played one season in the Argentine top flight. Its first appearance was in the 1996 Apertura.

Stadium

Titles 
 Primera B Nacional: 1
 1995–96

Players

External links 
  

Association football clubs established in 1918
Football clubs in Corrientes Province
1918 establishments in Argentina